Eastern Germany may refer to:

 New states of Germany, states that joined the Federal Republic of Germany after 1990

Historically:
 Former eastern territories of Germany, territories lost by Germany during and after the two world wars
 East Germany, namely the German Democratic Republic, the socialist state in existence between 1949 and 1990